Juang Jen-wuh (born 20 October 1950) is a Taiwanese judoka. He competed in the men's half-heavyweight event at the 1972 Summer Olympics.

References

1950 births
Living people
Taiwanese male judoka
Olympic judoka of Taiwan
Judoka at the 1972 Summer Olympics
Place of birth missing (living people)
20th-century Taiwanese people